Coroicoia ligata is a species of beetle in the family Cerambycidae, and the only species in the genus Coroicoia. It was described by Schwarzer in 1930.

References

Mauesiini
Beetles described in 1930